Pothyne laosica is a species of beetle in the family Cerambycidae. It was described by Breuning in 1968.

References

laosica
Beetles described in 1968